Phenacoccus solani, the solanum mealybug, is a species of mealybug in the family Pseudococcidae.

References

External links

 

Articles created by Qbugbot
Insects described in 1918
Pseudococcidae